Apriona pascoei is a species of beetle in the family Cerambycidae. It was described by Gilmour in 1958. It is known from Indonesia.

References

Batocerini
Beetles described in 1958